Lalrinawma is a Mizo National Front politician from Mizoram. He has been elected in Mizoram Legislative Assembly election in 2018 from Tuikum constituency as candidate of Mizo National Front. He is current Cabinet Minister of Mizoram Legislative Assembly.

References 

Living people
Mizo National Front politicians
Mizoram MLAs 2018–2023
Year of birth missing (living people)
People from Aizawl
Deputy Speakers of the Mizoram Legislative Assembly
Mizo people